Matti Merivirta (born Mathias Sjöström; 1866–1944) was a Finnish Lutheran clergyman and politician, born in Pori on 21 October 1866. He was a member of the Parliament of Finland from 1907 to 1908, representing the Christian Workers' Union of Finland (SKrTL). He died on 7 September 1944.

References

1866 births
1944 deaths
Christian Workers' Union of Finland politicians
19th-century Finnish Lutheran clergy
Lutheran socialists
Members of the Parliament of Finland (1907–08)
People from Pori
People from Turku and Pori Province (Grand Duchy of Finland)
University of Helsinki alumni
20th-century Finnish Lutheran clergy